The United Kingdom will participate in and host the Eurovision Song Contest 2023 in Liverpool. The British Broadcasting Corporation (BBC) internally selected Mae Muller to represent the country with her song "I Wrote a Song", in collaboration with TaP Music.

Background

Prior to the 2023 contest, the United Kingdom has participated in the Eurovision Song Contest sixty-four times. To this point, the nation is noted for having finished as the runner-up in a record sixteen contests.

The British national broadcaster, the BBC, broadcasts the event within the United Kingdom and organises the selection process for the nation's entry. The broadcaster confirmed their participation in the 2023 contest on 25 July 2022. Previously, the BBC has used a plethora of methods to select the UK entry: between 2011 and 2015, the BBC opted to internally select the British entry. For their 2016 entry, the broadcaster announced that a national final would be organised featuring a competition among several artists and songs to choose the British entry for the contest. The same process was used in 2017 and 2018, and changes were brought in for 2019. In 2020 and 2021, the BBC opted to return to an internal selection, in collaboration with record label BMG. For the 2022 contest, the BBC began collaboration with TaP Music to internally select the British entry, a process that was continued for 2023. On 25 July 2022, it was confirmed by the European Broadcasting Union (EBU) and the BBC that the UK would host the 2023 contest on behalf of the previous year's winning country , and Liverpool was later announced as the host city on 7 October.

Before Eurovision

Internal selection 
The British entry for the 2023 contest was internally selected by the BBC in collaboration with TaP Music. The selection process was confirmed on 8 September 2022, following the successful result for the United Kingdom at the 2022 contest. Rachel Ashdown, Commissioning Editor for the BBC, stated: 

On 31 January 2023, it was reported that four acts were left in the running to represent the United Kingdom at the 2023 contest. Among the rumoured candidates were Rina Sawayama, with Radio Times stating that she would represent the UK at the 2023 contest, though this was later denied by Sawayama's management; and Mimi Webb.

On 9 March 2023, during The Radio 2 Breakfast Show with Zoe Ball, Mae Muller was announced as the chosen entrant with her song "I Wrote a Song". Later that evening, Muller appeared in a special programme on BBC One, titled Eurovision 2023: Meet the UK Act, where she was interviewed by Scott Mills, followed by the first full televised broadcast of the song's music video. It was reported that the show was watched by an audience of over 2.76 million, becoming the second most watched TV show in the UK that day. She was interviewed the following day on that evening's edition of The One Show, where a behind-the-scenes look at the filming of the music video in Lithuania was broadcast.

At Eurovision 
The Eurovision Song Contest 2023 will take place at the Liverpool Arena in Liverpool. According to Eurovision rules, all nations with the exceptions of the host country and the "Big Five" (France, Germany, Italy, Spain and the United Kingdom) are required to qualify from one of two semi-finals in order to compete for the final; the top ten countries from each semi-final progress to the final. As such, the United Kingdom will automatically qualify to compete in the final as both the host country and a member of the "Big Five". During the semi-final allocation draw on 31 January 2023, the UK was drawn to vote in the second semi-final on 11 May 2023. On 13 March 2023, during the Heads of Delegation meeting, the UK was drawn to perform in position 26. It will be the first time since 2001 that a host country has closed the final.

Both semi-finals will be broadcast on BBC One and BBC iPlayer, with the commentary team consisting of Scott Mills and Rylan Clark. This will mark the first time ever that the semi-finals will be broadcast on BBC One. The final will be broadcast on BBC One's regional variations across the UK with commentary by Mel Giedroyc and Graham Norton, the latter of whom will also co-host the show, and on BBC Radio Merseyside with commentary by Claire Sweeney alongside a member of the public, to be chosen as part of the station's "The Voice of Eurovision" talent search campaign.

References

External links
 BBC's official Eurovision website

Countries in the Eurovision Song Contest 2023
United Kingdom in the Eurovision Song Contest
Eurovision Song Contest
Eurovision Song Contest